Ognjenka Milićević Lukač (26 December 1927 – 23 January 2008) was a Bosnian Serb director, acting professor, and theatre expert. She was a daughter of the prominent publicist and professor Nika Milićević (1897–1980). She translated dozens of works from Russian to Serbian language, she is author of the numerous essays, studies, and avocations from the theatrics, acting, and directing. She was the author and the main editor of the monographs of the Ljiljana Krstić and Petar Kralj, regarding Dobričin prsten award laureate. She was member of the managing council of the Atelje 212 Theatre, and later Yugoslav Drama Theatre. Founder and supervisor of the drama studio in the National Theater in Sarajevo, founder of Festival of monodrama and mime in Belgrade, and teacher of the Acting and History of the theater in the Faculty of the Dramatic Arts in Belgrade.

Career 
Milićević studied at the Saint Petersburg State Theatre Arts Academy and the Faculty of Drama Arts in Belgrade, where she graduated in 1952. She worked as a director at the National Theater in Sarajevo (1948–1950), and at the National Theatre in Belgrade (1950–1959).
Some of her famous students include Milenko Zablaćanski, Predrag Miletić, etc.

References

External links 

Death of Ognjenka
Ognjenka as Vice rector of the University of arts in Belgrade
Sterijino pozorje
Books by Ognjenka Milićević

1927 births
2008 deaths
People from Banja Luka
Serbs of Bosnia and Herzegovina
Serbian film directors
Serbian women film directors
Serbian women writers
Serbian non-fiction writers
Bosnia and Herzegovina film directors
Bosnia and Herzegovina women film directors
Russian State Institute of Performing Arts alumni
20th-century Bosnia and Herzegovina writers
20th-century Bosnia and Herzegovina women writers
20th-century non-fiction writers